Deer Park Airport may refer to:

Deer Park Airport (New York), in Deer Park, New York
Deer Park Airport (Washington), in Deer Park, Washington